is a Japanese animated television series, based on Masamune Shirow's manga Ghost in the Shell. The episodes were directed by Kenji Kamiyama, animated by Production I.G, and produced by Bandai Visual, Bandai Entertainment, Dentsu, Nippon Television Network, Tokuma Shoten, Victor Entertainment, and Manga Entertainment. Stand Alone Complex was first licensed and broadcast in 2002 by anime television network Animax across most of Asia. It was subsequently licensed in the United States and Canada by Bandai Entertainment and Manga Entertainment, in the United Kingdom by Manga Entertainment, and in Australia by Madman Entertainment. It continues to be broadcast in the United States as of May 2012 on Adult Swim, and was broadcast in Canada and the United Kingdom by YTV and AnimeCentral, respectively.

In the original pay-per-view broadcasts, the opening theme for each episode is "inner universe" (lyrics: Origa, Shanti Snyder; music: Yoko Kanno; vocals: Origa) and the ending theme for each episode is "lithium flower" (lyrics: Tim Jensen; music: Yoko Kanno; vocals: Scott Matthew). For the subsequent terrestrial television broadcasts, the opening theme for each episode is "GET9" (lyrics: Tim Jensen; music: Yoko Kanno, vocals: jillmax) and the ending theme is "I do" (lyrics & vocals: Ilaria Graziano; music Yoko Kanno). The original soundtrack, containing the original opening and closing themes in addition to other tracks from the series, was released by Victor Entertainment on January 22, 2002, in Japan, and by Bandai Visual on November 7, 2004, in the United States.

Thirteen DVD compilations, each containing two episodes, were released by Bandai Visual between December 21, 2002, and December 21, 2003. The English adaptation of the anime was released in seven DVD compilations, each containing four episodes, by Manga Entertainment and Bandai Entertainment between July 27, 2004, and July 26, 2005. Complete DVD collection boxes were released by Bandai Visual as a Limited Edition on July 27, 2007, in Japan, and by Manga Entertainment on October 31, 2006, in the United States.

Stand Alone Complex contains 14 "Stand Alone" (SA) episodes and 12 "Complex" (C) episodes. Stand Alone episodes take place independently of the main plot and focus on Public Security Section 9's investigation of isolated cases. Complex episodes advance the main plot, which follows Section 9's investigation of the Laughing Man incident: the kidnapping and subsequent release of a Japanese CEO by a sophisticated hacker.

A second season titled Ghost in the Shell: S.A.C. 2nd GIG was aired from January 1, 2004, to January 8, 2005. Unlike the first season, the second season has three designations denoting the type of episode: individual (IN), dividual (DI) and dual (DU). IN episodes tie in with the Individual Eleven storyline; DI episodes are stand-alone episodes that may still be tied into other storylines; and DU episodes tie in with the Cabinet Intelligence Service & Goda story-line (though the two main storylines inter-relate). There are 11 individual, 11 dividual and 4 dual episodes. In the United States the TV Parental Guidelines system rated the episodes from TV-14 to TV-MA.

Series overview

Episode list

Stand Alone Complex

S.A.C. 2nd GIG

Tachikomatic Days

Tachikomatic Days are a series of comedic shorts attached to the end of every episode of Ghost in the Shell: Stand Alone Complex featuring the Tachikoma think tanks of Section 9.

See also

 Ghost in the Shell: Stand Alone Complex - Solid State Society

References

Episodes 1st GIG
Ghost In The Shell: Stand Alone Complex (Season 1)